South Wiltshire UTC was a mixed University Technical College (UTC) in Salisbury, Wiltshire, England. It opened in 2015 and catered for students aged 14–19 years.

The college specialised in science and engineering, and was backed by the University of Southampton.

In July 2019, it was announced the college would not be accepting students in September 2019, and would be closed in August 2020 as the Department for Education deemed it "no longer financially viable". The one-year delay was for the benefit of students already a year into their two-year courses.

References

External links 
 Official website archived in July 2019 by the Internet Archive

Defunct schools in Wiltshire
Educational institutions established in 2015
2015 establishments in England
Defunct University Technical Colleges
Educational institutions disestablished in 2020
2020 disestablishments in England